The President's Committee for People with Intellectual Disabilities (PCPID) is an advisory body that provides assistance to the President of the United States and the Secretary of Health and Human Services on public policy issues related to intellectual disability. It was started as a blue-ribbon panel by John F. Kennedy in 1961, and later reorganized through executive order into an official panel by Lyndon B. Johnson in 1966, with the goal of ensuring the right to a "decent, dignified place in society". Originally known as the President's Committee on Mental Retardation, it was eventually renamed in 2003 by George W. Bush over concerns regarding negative labelling. It was established through the work of Eunice Kennedy Shriver while serving as the head of the Joseph P. Kennedy Jr. Foundation.

The PCPID consists of a 31-member panel composed of 18 citizen members and 13 government officials, with the number of citizen members capped at 21, and each citizen serving maximum two-year terms. The citizen members are each appointed by the president, and the government members consist of the following:

 Secretary of Health and Human Services 
 Secretary of Education
 Secretary of Labor
 Secretary of Housing and Urban Development 
 Secretary of Commerce
 Secretary of Transportation
 Secretary of the Interior 
 Secretary of Homeland Security
 Attorney General
 Chief Executive Officer of the Corporation for National and Community Service
 Chair of the Equal Employment Opportunity Commission
 Chair of the National Council on Disability
 Commissioner of the Social Security Administration

The committee receives no federal funding, and administers no grants. The PCPID holds formal meetings twice per year, and issues an annual report providing advice and recommendations. The scope of the PCPID according to its governing executive order is intellectual disability as it relates to:

 Expansion of educational opportunities
 Promotion of homeownership
 Assurance of workplace integration
 Improvement of transportation options
 Expansion of full access to community living
 Increasing access to assistive and universally designed technologies

In 1974 the goals of the committee were realigned by Richard Nixon, with a focus on deinstitutionalization, preventive care,  and legal rights, and again in 1996 by Bill Clinton, with a focus on community inclusion.

The committee is located organizationally under the Administration for Community Living and the Department of Health and Human Services.

See also

 Health care in the United States
 History of psychiatric institutions

References

External links

 
 Fact Sheet: President's Committee for People with Intellectual Disabilities from the Administration on Intellectual and Developmental Disabilities

Administration for Children and Families programs
Government agencies established in 1961
1961 establishments in the United States